Typhoon Games Ltd. was founded in August 2001 in Hong Kong as a game developing and publishing company that caters mainly to the Asian market. It is the sister company of Typhoon Media International Ltd. and has strategic partnerships with Outblaze Ltd. and Dream Cortex.

Typhoon Games has published several PC games including Yu-Gi-Oh! Online and Gurumin: A Monstrous Adventure, and has developed games such as The Impossible Team Online Game and Hello Kitty: Roller Rescue for the PlayStation 2.

References

External links 
 Typhoon Games official site

Video game companies established in 2001
Entertainment companies of Hong Kong
Video game companies of China
Video game development companies